Chunja or Chun-ja may refer to:
Chunja, Rapti, village in Nepal
Chunja (singer), South Korean singer
Chunja (name), Korean female given name

See also